The 1920 Victorian soccer season was the ninth competitive season of soccer in the Australian state of Victoria, under association with the governing body of Football Victoria. Only two conferences of the 'Victorian Division 1' were contested, which as of 2021 season is recognized as the NPL. The calendar season saw the ninth installment of the Dockerty Cup, but in the first time in its history the competition was abandoned shortly before the grand final, in which Albert Park was to verse Northumberland and Durham United.

Overview
Following the 1919 season, Football Victoria and its clubs were still recovering from the effects of World War I. Division 1 grew from eight teams to twelve, with the return of Burns and St Kilda, along with the debuts of newly established clubs of Melbourne Welsh and Osborne House. As a result of twelve teams confirming their commitment for the season, the league was split into two conferences with a final series determining the champions. The series consisted of the premiers and runners up of the two conferences, with Northumberland and Durham United defeating St Kilda 2–0 in the grand final, being the first occasion in which a runner up team were to be crowned champions. This feat would be one of three first time occasions in the history of the league. The other two occasions consisted of the fact that a team finished undefeated but would not become premiers, with Osborne House playing less than half of the season, but won all four of its matches. The third first time occasion was Windsor becoming the first team to have a point deduction. Windsor would have been Conference B premiers but were penalized four points which resulted them in finishing third.

Ladders

Division 1A

Division 1B

References

Football Federation Victoria
Soccer in Victoria (Australia)